Sans titre is French for untitled. It may refer to:

 Sans titre (album), a 2009 album by Corneille
Sans titre, an 1838 book by Xavier Forneret
Sans Titre, a 1997 short film by Leos Carax
Sans titre, work by Albert Féraud
Sans titre, a 1999 exhibition by Edward McHugh